José Antonio Quintanilla Escobar (29 October 1947 – 1977) was a former footballer from El Salvador who played as a midfielder.

Club career
Quintanilla was a member of the 1966 and 1967 league championship winning side of Alianza. He also played for Atlético Marte  
and Once Municipal. He died in a road accident when on his way for a training at Once Municipal.

International career
Nicknamed el Ruso, Quintanilla represented El Salvador at the 1968 Summer Olympics, in 10 FIFA World Cup qualification matches and at the 1970 FIFA World Cup in México. He earned 22 caps.

References

External links

1947 births
People from Sonsonate Department
Association football midfielders
Salvadoran footballers
El Salvador international footballers
Olympic footballers of El Salvador
Footballers at the 1968 Summer Olympics
1970 FIFA World Cup players
C.D. Atlético Marte footballers
Once Municipal footballers
Alianza F.C. footballers
Road incident deaths in El Salvador
1977 deaths